Iain Campbell (born 28 June 1985) is a Scottish professional footballer who plays for Montrose. After beginning his career at Dunfermline Athletic he has since played for Kilmarnock, Ross County, Clyde, Alloa Athletic, Cowdenbeath and Forfar Athletic.

Career
Born in Kirkcaldy, Campbell started his career with Dunfermline Athletic. He made 36 appearances and scored one goal, against Motherwell at Fir Park on 29 April 2006, in a 3–2 win. In August 2006, he moved to fellow SPL club Kilmarnock for an undisclosed fee. He didn't make an appearance for Killie, and was sent on loan to Ross County in August 2007 till the end of the year.

On 31 January 2008, Campbell was loaned out again, this time to Clyde until May 2008. He made his debut in a 3–1 defeat by Stirling Albion on 2 February 2008. He was released by Kilmarnock in June 2008, and joined Alloa Athletic. He joined Forfar Athletic a year later.

In June 2014, Campbell signed for Scottish Championship club Cowdenbeath. Campbell returned to Forfar Athletic on 15 January 2015, signing on a one-month loan. Campbell joined Forfar permanently in July 2015, staying with the club for one season before moving to Montrose at the start of the 2016–17 season, initially on a one-month deal to provide cover for injured defenders Michael Bolochoweckyj and Chris Hegarty. He was part of the squad which won the 2017–18 Scottish League Two title and subsequently participated in the promotion play-offs from League One the following year.

Personal life
He is the son of Dick Campbell who has managed Dunfermline Athletic, Brechin City, Partick Thistle and Ross County and is currently manager of Arbroath. Iain has been managed twice during his career by his father, at Ross County and Forfar Athletic. His older brother Ross is also a footballer, a forward who was a teammate at both Forfar and Montrose.

Career statistics

References

External links

 Ross County stats

Living people
1985 births
Scottish footballers
Scottish Premier League players
Scottish Football League players
Dunfermline Athletic F.C. players
Kilmarnock F.C. players
Ross County F.C. players
Clyde F.C. players
Alloa Athletic F.C. players
Forfar Athletic F.C. players
Cowdenbeath F.C. players
Montrose F.C. players
Footballers from Kirkcaldy
Association football defenders
Scottish Professional Football League players